Von Colson v Land Nordrhein-Westfalen (1984) Case 14/83 is an EU law case, concerning the conflict of law between a national legal system and European Union law.

Facts
Sabine Von Colson and Elisabeth Kamann were German social workers who applied to work in men's prisons run by the State of North Rhine-Westphalia. Both were rejected on the basis they were women.

Von Colson and Kamann appealed the decision at the Arbeitsgericht (Labour Tribunal). Under European Communities law, the Equal Treatment Directive (76/207/EEC) required member states to give effect to principle of equal treatment and obliged them to provide a legal remedy. The claimants argued that they had a directly effective right to demand that the court order the employer to appoint her. Instead of this or compensation, they were awarded only "reliance losses" as a remedy, equivalent to the travel costs incurred by going to the interview (7.20 DM).

Judgment
Lack of precision in the directive prevented it from having direct effect, but the Court directed that the national legislation be interpreted in light of the directive. Ultimately, the claimants were not entitled to a remedy that guaranteed their appointment to the post from which they had been discriminated against, but the member state would be liable to provide a remedy. Compensation for the discrimination suffered could be carried out in several ways, including via the payment of damages. The Court also required the remedy to be sufficient to ensure the effectiveness of Community (now EU) law.

See also

European Union law

References

Court of Justice of the European Union case law
German case law
1984 in case law